Good Like That may refer to:

"Good Like That", song by Kylie Minogue from Fever
"Good Like That", song  by Yppah from You Are Beautiful at All Times